Jovan Hutton Pulitzer (self-styled as Commander Pulitzer and formerly Jeffry Jovan Philyaw) is an American entrepreneur and former treasure hunter from Dallas, Texas, known for inventing the widely-criticized CueCat barcode scanner and "kinematic artifact detection" technology to find folds and bamboo fibers in election ballots. His marketing work includes the online show Net Talk Live! and selling crystals.

Marketing
From 1994–1995 he was a marketing executive at Internet America in Dallas. Known mononymously as Jovan, during the late 1990s he was a marketer and infomercial producer who ran the Dallas company Digital Convergence, saying he worked on Susan Powter's marketing campaign and promoting Tripledge Wipers. He launched and co-hosted Net Talk Live from 1996 to 2001, a "triplecast" show about the internet that was broadcast on radio, TV, and online using RealAudio. It lasted 266 episodes and claimed to have a weekly reach of over 800 million households. The Dallas Morning News said they "do know something about computers, but spend most of the time laughing and talking about things such as where they had dinner last week."

CueCat

As the chairman and chief executive officer of Digital Convergence, Pulitzer released the CueCat, a wired, handheld device that scanned barcodes printed in newspapers and other publications to allow readers to go directly to linked content on the then-nascent web without typing in the URL. Despite investments of $185 million from Radio Shack, Coca Cola, General Motors, Belo, and others, it was a commercial failure and sales never recovered after the discovery of a major security flaw and privacy breaches in 2000. It was one of the most ridiculed products of the dotcom era, and he changed his name following its failure.

Intellectual property
He went on to run a patent holding company in Dallas. His company J. Hutton Pulitzer and Co. in the mid 2000s sold bottled rainwater under the brand Purain and crystals for over $100,000. He claims to have filed over 100 patents and to be the most prolific inventor since Thomas Edison.

Treasure hunting
In 2016, Pulitzer appeared as a treasure hunter on The Curse of Oak Island on the History Channel. He searched for the Ark of the Covenant and working with amateur historians from the Ancient Artifact Preservation Society he claimed that a sword found in the waters off Oak Island in Nova Scotia had "magical magnetic properties" and was evidence of Roman presence in North America and contact with the Miꞌkmaq, which a historian of that people dismissed. An archaeologist and a science writer who criticized Pulitzer's claim and suggested the sword was a replica say that Pulitzer threatened to sue them.

Election audit

Pulitzer claims to have invented a system for detecting fraudulent ballots, which is being used by right-wing conspiracists such as Doug Logan in the  Republican audit of ballots in Arizona, intended to prove the claim that the 2020 United States Presidential election result was fraudulent. There is no evidence that fraudulent ballots were cast or that Pulitzer's "kinematic marker" detection system works. The Georgia Secretary of State's office issued a statement rejecting a claim by Pulitzer to have hacked Georgia's voting system. Pulitzer is said to be the originator of the claim that Chinese ballots with paper containing bamboo are part of the claimed fraud.

Works
Pulitzer claims to have written 300 books on history. His books include How to Cut Off Your Arm and Eat Your Dog: Plus, Other Recipes for Survival.

Personal life
Pulitzer says he began in marketing aged 9, selling rabbit meat to restaurants. He is divorced.

References

External links
 
 

Living people
Year of birth unknown
Businesspeople from Dallas
American technology company founders
20th-century American businesspeople
21st-century American businesspeople
American marketing businesspeople
Internet marketing people
Year of birth missing (living people)
Inventors from Texas